Kosmas Air was a charter cargo airline based in Belgrade, Serbia. The airline's main field of activity covered air freight and transport of humanitarian aid relief from Europe to Middle East, Asia and Africa.

History

Kosmas Air was the first Cargo Air Operator in Serbia with its home base in Belgrade. AOC for charter cargo worldwide was issued in May 2004. First services commenced with an Ilyushin Il-76TD with the registration YU-AMI in July 2004. AOC was revoked by CAD of Serbia in May 2008.

Destinations

The airline operated out of Austria, Czech Republic, Denmark, Estonia, Netherlands, Spain, Switzerland carrying humanitarian and relief cargo to Tsunami areas (Sri Lanka, Banda Aceh, Medan, Kuala Lumpur) in January 2005.

Fleet
Kosmas Air operated the following aircraft:
1 Ilyushin Il-76 TD cargo aircraft

References

External links
 Kosmas Air

Defunct airlines of Serbia
Defunct companies of Serbia
Airlines established in 2004
Airlines disestablished in 2008
Defunct cargo airlines
2008 disestablishments in Serbia
Serbian companies established in 2004